Antigua and Barbuda competed at the 2014 Summer Youth Olympics, in Nanjing, China from 16 August to 28 August 2014.

Athletics

Antigua and Barbuda qualified two athletes.

Qualification Legend: Q=Final A (medal); qB=Final B (non-medal); qC=Final C (non-medal); qD=Final D (non-medal); qE=Final E (non-medal)

Boys
Track & road events

Girls
Track & road events

Sailing

Antigua and Barbuda was given a reallocation boat based on being a top ranked nation not yet qualified.

Swimming

Antigua and Barbuda qualified two swimmers.

Boys

Girls

References

2014 in Antigua and Barbuda sport
Nations at the 2014 Summer Youth Olympics
Antigua and Barbuda at the Youth Olympics